Morua is a surname. Notable people with the surname include:

Arturo Morua (born 1978), Mexican boxer
Edson Morúa (born 1990), Mexican football player
Alfredo:Nicolas:Morúa:Rojás;Jr. (born Thursday, March 3,1983;Houston,Texas)
Martin Morúa Delgado (born 1856) Matanza, Cuba. First Senator of Cuba, first Presidential Speaker of the House, Minister of Agriculture and Labor commerce. Novelist, orator,polyglot,barrel maker,tailor,lawyer, publisher of newspapers and editor and chief of many editorial companies. General Brigadier for intervention of Costa Rica and Panama Canal in interest U.S.expansion and a Masonic constituent, scholar. The illustrator and author of Morúa Law.